Pemberton is an English, Anglo Saxon surname first found in Pemberton, Greater Manchester, a residential area of Wigan, historically a part of Lancashire. It is common in the United Kingdom, and in places with an English diaspora such as Australia and the United States .

Etymologically, it consists of the elements Pen, Brythonic for hill or head, ber Anglo-Saxon for barley, and ton Anglo-Saxon for an enclosure or field; thus "Barley field on the hill".

Surname
Amy Pemberton, (born 1988), British actress
Brock Pemberton (1885–1950), American theatrical producer and director
Caroline Pemberton (born 1986), Australian model
Charles Reece Pemberton (1790–1840), British actor and lecturer
Charley Pemberton (1854–1894), son of John Pemberton
Cyril Pemberton (1886–1975), US entomologist
Daniel Pemberton (born 1977), English composer
Ebenezer Pemberton (minister) (1671–1717), colonial American Congregational clergyman, bibliophile, and minister
Ebenezer Pemberton (1746–1835), American educator
Henry Pemberton (1694–1771), English physician and man of letters
Hugh Pemberton (1890–1956), physician
Hugh Pemberton (historian), historian
John Pemberton (1831–1888), inventor of Coca-Cola in Atlanta, Georgia in 1886
John Pemberton (footballer) (born 1964), English football (soccer) player
John C. Pemberton (1814–1881), Confederate States Army general in the American Civil War (1861–1865)
Johnny Pemberton (born 1981), American actor and comedian
Joseph Despard Pemberton, Canadian surveyor-general
 Joseph Scott Pemberton, a US Marine lance corporal who was charged with homicide for the killing of Jennifer Laude, a Filipino trans woman
Max Pemberton (1863–1950), British novelist
Robin Leigh-Pemberton, Baron Kingsdown (born 1952), Governor of the  Bank of England (1983–1993)
Sophie Pemberton (1869–1959), Canadian painter
Stanton C. Pemberton (188–1944), American businessman and politician
Steve Pemberton (born 1967), British comedy writer and performer
Steven Pemberton (born 1953), computer scientist
Thomas Edgar Pemberton (1849–1905), English playwright and theatrical historian
Tom Pemberton (born 1969), English chef
Victor Pemberton, British script writer and novelist
Imogen Pemberton (born 2010),English dancer

Fictional characters
Frank Pemberton, in the novel The Sweetness at the Bottom of the Pie by Alan Bradley
Guy and Simon Pemberton, characters on the BBC R4 soap The Archers
 Sylvester Pemberton, DC Comics superhero the Star-Spangled Kid
 Greg Pemberton

See also
Pemberton (disambiguation)

References

English-language surnames
English toponymic surnames